Příbraz is a municipality and village in Jindřichův Hradec District in the South Bohemian Region of the Czech Republic. It has about 500 inhabitants. The centre of the village is well preserved and is protected by law as a village monument zone.

Gallery

References

Villages in Jindřichův Hradec District